The fourth edition of the A3 Champions Cup took place in Tokyo, Japan, between 2 and 8 August 2006. It was won by Korean team Ulsan Hyundai Horang-i, who came back strongly from their defeat in the opening match to win the following two by margins of 6–0 and 4–0. It was the third time a Korean team has won this competition.

Participants 
  Dalian Shide - 2005 Chinese Super League Champions
  Gamba Osaka  - 2005 J. League Champions
  JEF United Chiba - 2005 Yamazaki Nabisco Cup Winners (invited) 
  Ulsan Hyundai Horang-i - 2005 K-League Champions

Group table

Matches 
Round 1

Round 2

Round 3

Awards

Winners

Individual Awards

Goalscorers

References
 A3 Champions Cup (Tokyo) 2006, from RSSSF

A3
A3
2006
2006